The Development Reform Cabinet was the Indonesian cabinet which served under President B. J. Habibie during his term as president from 23 May 1998 to 20 October 1999.

Despite having the word "Reform" as part of its name, the Development Reform Cabinet consisted mostly of the names which had served in Suharto's Seventh Development Cabinet. There were however some reformist actions taken with the line up of this cabinet. The governor of the central bank and the attorney general were originally left out of the cabinet as part of Habibie's desire to make the two positions independent of executive control  Habibie was successful in giving the governor of the central bank independent authority although he would continue to retain control of the attorney general. Another reformist step taken was the inclusion of United Development Party member and future chairman Hamzah Haz instead of keeping the cabinet exclusive to Golkar and members of the Indonesian National Armed Forces.

President
President: B. J. Habibie

Coordinating ministers
Coordinating Minister of Politics and Security: Gen. (ret.) Feisal Tanjung
Coordinating Minister of Economics, Finance, and Industry: Ginandjar Kartasasmita
Coordinating Minister of Development Supervision and State Apparatus Utilization: Hartarto Sastrosoenarto
Coordinating Minister of People's Welfare and Abolition of Poverty: Haryono Suyono

Departmental ministers
Minister of Home Affairs: Lt. Gen. Syarwan Hamid
Minister of Foreign Affairs: Ali Alatas
Minister of Defense and Security/Commander of the Armed Forces: Gen. Wiranto
Minister of Justice: Muladi
Minister of Information: Lt. Gen. Yunus Yosfiah
Minister of Finance: Bambang Subianto
Minister of Industry and Trade: Rahardi Ramelan
Minister of Agriculture: Soleh Solahuddin
Minister of Mines and Energy: Kuntoro Mangkusubroto
Minister of Forestry and Plantation: Muslimin Nasution
Minister of Public Works: Rachmadi Bambang Sumadhijo
Minister of Transportation: Giri Suseno Harihardjono
Minister of Tourism, Arts, and Culture: Marzuki Usman
Minister of Cooperatives, Small and Medium Businesses: Adi Sasono
Minister of Manpower: Fahmi Idris
Minister of Transmigration and Forest Settlement: Lt. Gen. A. M. Hendropriyono
Minister of Education and Culture: Juwono Sudarsono
Minister of Health: Farid Anfasa Moeloek
Minister of Social Welfare: Justika Baharsjah

State ministers
State Minister/State Secretary: Akbar Tanjung
State Minister of Research and Technology/Chairman of Research and Implementation of Technology Board (BPPT): M. Zuhal
State Minister of Investment/Chairman of the Investment Coordinating Body (BKPM): Hamzah Haz
State Minister of Agrarian Affairs/Chairman of the National Land Body (BPN): Hasan Basri Durin
State Minister of Housing and Settlement: Theo L. Sambuaga
State Minister of Environment: Panangian Siregar
State Minister of State-Owned Enterprises: Tanri Abeng
State Minister of Planning and National Development/Chairman of National Development Planning Body (BAPPENAS): Boediono
State Minister of Female Empowerment: Tutty Alawiyah
State Minister of Youth and Sports: Agung Laksono
State Minister of Foodstuffs and Horticulture: A. M. Saefuddin
State Minister of Population/Chairman of Planned Families National Coordinating Body (BKKBN): Ida Bagus Oka

Official with the rank of minister
Attorney General: Sudjono C. Atmanegara

Changes
15 June 1998: Sudjono C. Atmanegara replaced by Maj. Gen. Andi Muhammad Ghalib as Attorney General.
May 1999: Hamzah Haz stepped down as State Minister of Investment/Chairman of BKPM and his position was taken over by Marzuki Uzman. 
May 1999: Akbar Tanjung stepped down as State Minister/State Secretary and his position was taken over by Muladi.

See also
BJ Habibie

References

Notes

Post-Suharto era
Cabinets of Indonesia
1998 establishments in Indonesia
1999 disestablishments in Indonesia
Cabinets established in 1998
Cabinets disestablished in 1999